Roope Riski (born 16 August 1991) is a Finnish professional footballer who plays as a forward for Veikkausliiga club HJK Helsinki.

He is known as a clinical, well-positioned forward who can get into the right place at the right time. In the middle of the 2010 season, Riski was selected to the opening squad for the first time of his career. Since then he has enjoyed a phenomenal season, starting 12 games and scoring 11 goals. He has the best game/goal ratio in the Veikkausliiga.

Club career
On 22 September 2010, Riski scored a hat-trick against AC Oulu. By doing this, he became the first ever player in Finland to score a hat-trick in all the highest three levels of Finnish football system during one season.

From 27 January 2011 he is an official Cesena player.
 He made his Serie A debut on 19 March 2011 against Lazio on Stadio Olimpico (1−0 away loss) as a 69th-minute substitute for Fabio Caserta, he has had loan spell in Finland for TPS Turku in 2012 and Hønefoss BK in Norway. In August 2012, Riski joined English side Derby County on trial ahead of their pre-season against Chesterfield, where he started in a 3–1 loss, he scored in a reserve friendly against Matlock Town.

On 8 February 2016, SJK announced the signing of Riski on a two-year contract. On 10 January 2017, he was loaned to SC Paderborn.

On 21 November 2019, HJK Helsinki confirmed the signing of Riski on a contract until the end of 2021 with an option for one further year.

International career
On 19 January 2015, Riski made his senior debut for the Finland national team in a 1–0 friendly against Sweden, where he scored the only goal of the match.

He was called up for the UEFA Euro 2020 pre-tournament friendly match against Sweden on 29 May 2021.

Personal life
He is the younger brother of Riku Riski, who plays for HJK Helsinki and the Finland national team.

Career statistics

Club

International
Scores and results list Finland's goal tally first, score column indicates score after each Riski goal.

Honours
SJK
 Veikkausliiga: 2015

HJK
 Veikkausliiga: 2020
 Finnish Cup: 2020

Individual
Finnish League Cup Top goalscorer: 2016
Veikkausliiga Player of the Year: 2020 
Veikkausliiga Striker of the Year: 2020 
Veikkausliiga Team of the Year: 2016, 2020

References

Sources
 Roope Riski palaa pitkällä sopimuksella SJK-paitaan, veikkausliiga.com, 8 February 2016

External links

 

1991 births
Living people
Finnish footballers
Association football forwards
Finland international footballers
Finland under-21 international footballers
Veikkausliiga players
Ykkönen players
Serie A players
Eliteserien players
Norwegian First Division players
3. Liga players
Austrian Football Bundesliga players
Football League (Greece) players
Turun Palloseura footballers
A.C. Cesena players
Hønefoss BK players
FC Viikingit players
Åbo IFK players
SC Paderborn 07 players
FK Haugesund players
Seinäjoen Jalkapallokerho players
SKN St. Pölten players
AO Chania F.C. players
Helsingin Jalkapalloklubi players
Finnish expatriate footballers
Finnish expatriate sportspeople in Italy
Expatriate footballers in Italy
Finnish expatriate sportspeople in Germany
Expatriate footballers in Germany
Finnish expatriate sportspeople in Austria
Expatriate footballers in Austria
Finnish expatriate sportspeople in Greece
Expatriate footballers in Greece
Finnish expatriate sportspeople in Norway
Expatriate footballers in Norway